St. Joseph High School (SJHS) is a private, Roman Catholic high school in Santa Maria, California. It is located in the Roman Catholic Archdiocese of Los Angeles.

History
St. Joseph High School opened in 1964 and graduated its first class in 1968.

In 2013, Shane Villalpando, a former St. Joseph High School student, was sentenced to one year in Santa Barbara County Jail and five years probation for having unlawful sex with underage teenagers at the high school. Villalpando was 18 years old at the time of one of the rapes while the victim of that incident was 14. Dean of students John Walker and principal Joseph Myers did not report a rape to law enforcement because they thought the incident had already been reported; however, both administrators were required by law to report suspected child abuse. Both resigned from their positions in 2012, were convicted of a misdemeanor, and were ordered to pay several hundred dollars in fines.

Athletics
St. Joseph High School athletic teams are nicknamed the Knights. Since 2018, the school has competed in the Central Coast Athletic Association, which is affiliated with the CIF Central Section. Previously, SJHS was a long-time member of the CIF Southern Section  and competed in the Pac-8 League.

Notable alumni
 Mark Brunell, National Football League quarterback; won Super Bowl XLIV with New Orleans Saints
 Tom Rehder, NFL offensive lineman; won Super Bowl XXV with New York Giants
 Bill Simas, Major League Baseball pitcher, Chicago White Sox
 Mark Velasquez, photographer and contestant on season one of Work of Art: The Next Great Artist

Notes and references

External links
 

Catholic secondary schools in California
High schools in Santa Barbara County, California
Educational institutions established in 1964
1964 establishments in California